Phil Hornby is a British news reporter who currently works for ITV Meridian in the South East of England.

Hornby is Meridian's Political Editor. Previously, he was the main news presenter for the South East version of the programme Meridian Tonight (now ITV News Meridian) alongside colleague Charlotte Hawkins but they have both moved on to other roles in news. In addition, Hornby presents the local political programme The Last Word. Prior to joining ITV Meridian, Hornby worked for predecessor TVS.

References

British television presenters
ITV regional newsreaders and journalists
Living people
Year of birth missing (living people)